Amar Es Combatir (English: "To Love Is To Fight") is the seventh studio album released by the Mexican pop rock band Maná. The album, which was released on August 22, 2006, became the band's first release in four years.

On February 11, 2007, the album won a Grammy Award in the category of Best Latin Rock/Alternative Album. On April 26, 2007 it received two Billboard Latin Music Awards.

The band Re-released this album with a Deluxe Limited Edition CD & DVD on March 27, 2007. The album was a commercial success selling more than 2.1 million copies worldwide.

Track listing

Personnel 
 Francisco Ayon – assistant
 Miguel Bustamante – assistant engineer
 Juan Calleros – bass guitar, group member
 Juan Luis Guerra – guest vocals
 Albert Sterling Menendez – keyboards
 Fher Olvera – acoustic guitar, harmonica, electric guitar, main vocals, producer, choir, concept design, group member
 Carlos Perez – graphic design, creative director, concept design
 Fernando Quintana – choir
 Luis Rey – choir
 Thom Russo – mixing, recording
 Fabian Serrano – digital editing, coordination
 Fernando Vallín – guitar, bajo sexto, digital editing, choir, guitar technician
 Sergio Vallin – acoustic guitar, electric guitar, choir, group member
 Javier Valverde – digital editing, assistant engineer
 Alex González - drums, percussion, choir, group member

Commercial performance 
Amar Es Combatir debuted at #4 on the Billboard 200 chart and #1 on the Billboard Top Rock Albums chart, selling nearly 87,000 copies in its first week of release in the United States. This marked the highest first-week sales and chart position for a Spanish language album by a duo or group and the first Spanish language album to debut atop the rock albums tally. It is also tied with Shakira's Fijación Oral Vol. 1 (2005) as the highest debut of a Spanish language album in the history of Billboard. Both albums were surpassed in December 2020 by Puerto-Rican singer Bad Bunny with his album El Último Tour del Mundo, which debuted at number-one on the chart.

The album has produced three Billboard Hot Latin Tracks number-one singles: "Labios Compartidos", "Bendita Tu Luz" and "Manda Una Señal".

Charts

Album

Singles

Sales and certifications

Awards 
Billboard Latin Music Awards
 Latin Rock/Alternative Album of the Year
 Latin Pop Airplay Song of the Year by a Duo or Group – "Labios Compartidos"

Grammy Awards
 Best Latin Rock/Alternative Album

MTV Video Music Awards Latin America
 Video of the Year – "Labios Compartidos"
 Best Rock Artist
 MTV Legend Award

See also 
2006 in Latin music
 Amar es Combatir Tour
List of best-selling Latin albums in the United States
 List of best-selling Latin albums

References

External links 
 Official website of the band
 [ Review and overview] at Allmusic, has discography

2006 albums
Maná albums
Warner Music Latina albums
Grammy Award for Best Latin Rock, Urban or Alternative Album